The 1984 France rugby union tour of New Zealand was a series of eight matches played in June 1984 by the France national rugby union team in New Zealand. The team won all six of their matches against New Zealand provincial teams but lost both their internationals against the New Zealand All Blacks.

Results
Scores and results list France's points tally first.

Test matches

First Test

NEW ZEALAND: Allan Hewson, John Kirwan, Steven Pokere, Bruce Smith, Warwick Taylor, Wayne Smith, Andy Donald, John Ashworth, Andy Dalton (c), Gary Knight, Gary Whetton, Andy Haden, Mark Shaw, Murray Mexted, Jock Hobbs

FRANCE: Serge Blanco, Patrice Lagisquet, Didier Codorniou, Philippe Sella, Patrick Esteve, Jean-Patrick Lescarboura, Pierre Berbizier, Pierre Dospital, Philippe Dintrans (c), Jean-Pierre Garuet, François Haget, Jean Condom, Laurent Rodriguez, Jean-Charles Orso, Jean-Luc Joinel.

Second Test

NEW ZEALAND: Allan Hewson, John Kirwan, Steven Pokere, Bruce Smith, Warwick Taylor, Wayne Smith, Andy Donald, John Ashworth, Andy Dalton (c), Gary Knight, Gary Whetton, Andy Haden, Mark Shaw, Murray Mexted, Jock Hobbs

FRANCE: Serge Blanco, Patrice Lagisquet, Didier Codorniou (rep Eric Bonneval), Philippe Sella, Patrick Esteve, Jean-Patrick Lescarboura, Pierre Berbizier, Pierre Dospital, Philippe Dintrans (c), Jean-Pierre Garuet, François Haget, Jean Condom, Laurent Rodriguez, Jacques Gratton, Jean-Luc Joinel.

Touring party

Manager: Yves Noé
Assistant Manager: Jacques Fouroux
Captain: Philippe Dintrans

Full backs
Serge Blanco
Bernard Vivies

Three-quarters
Patrice Lagisquet
Patrick Estève
Laurent Pardo
Marc Andrieu
Philippe Sella
Didier Codorniou
Eric Bonneval

Half-backs
Jean-Patrick Lescarboura
Guy Laporte
Pierre Berbizier
Henri Sanz

Forwards
Bernard Herrero
Philippe Dintrans
Pierre-Edouard Detrez
Daniel Dubroca
Jean-Pierre Garuet-Lempirou
Pierre Dospital
Alain Lorieux
Francis Haget
Jean Condom
Pierre Lacans
Jean-Charles Orso
Laurent Rodriguez
Jacques Gratton
Jean-Luc Joinel

References

France tour
France rugby
1984
Rugby union tours of New Zealand
France national rugby union team tours
tour